Kovalyovka is a rural locality (a village) in Leninsky Selsoviet, Kuyurgazinsky District, Bashkortostan, Russia. The population was 81 as of 2010. There are 6 streets.

Geography 
Kovalyovka is located 29 km northeast of Yermolayevo (the district's administrative centre) by road. Khudayberdino is the nearest rural locality.

References 

Rural localities in Kuyurgazinsky District